The  is a railway line in Kanagawa Prefecture, Japan, operated by East Japan Railway Company (JR East). It approximately parallels the east bank of the Sagami River. The line connects Hashimoto Station in Sagamihara and Chigasaki Station in Chigasaki.

Services
All services on the line are operated as local trains.

Between March 1991 and 11 March 2022, some trains operated through services onto the Yokohama Line beyond Hashimoto and made four additional stops, terminating at Hachiōji Station.

Rolling stock
 E131-500 series four-car EMUs (from 18 November 2021)

Former Rolling Stock:
 KiHa 4 DMU
 KiHa 10 DMU (until 1980)
 KiHa 20 DMU (1958–1982)
 KiHa 26-400 (under KiHa 55 family)
 KiHa 30
 KiHa 35 (1986–1991)
 KiHa 36
 205-500 series four-car EMUs (from 1991—2022)

The Sagami Line formerly operated a series of Diesel Multiple Unit passenger trains before electrification. The 205-500 series four-car EMUs were introduced in 1991 after the line was electrified. New E131-500 series EMUs replaced the older 205 series EMUs starting from Fall 2021.

Stations
 All stations located in Kanagawa Prefecture.
 All trains stop at every station.
 Stations marked "o", "v", or "^" allow passing; stations marked"｜" do not.

History

The Chigasaki to Samukawa section was opened by the Sagami Railway (Sōtetsu) in 1921, primarily to haul gravel. The line was extended to Atsugi in 1926, and to Hashimoto in 1931.

The line was nationalized in 1944 during World War II; the private Sagami Railway began operating the then , now the Sagami Railway Main Line.

A short branch to Nishi-Samukawa Station from Samukawa Station was closed in 1984, and freight services ceased in 1998.

After privatization of Japanese National Railways (JNR) in 1987, the line was electrified in 1991. Before the JNR privatization, there were discussions to transfer the line to the Sagami Railway in order meet the expected demands of passenger traffic in the Tokyo and Yokohama suburbs. Because it had long been left as a non-electrified rural line, the cost to upgrade the line was beyond the ability of then financially constrained JNR; Sagami Railway, on the other hand, was running a profitable operation on its own line. However, the two companies did not agree on a deal, and plans to transfer the line were cancelled.

Upon electrification, through services to the Yokohama Line began, using the new 205-500 series EMUs. The through service operation ended on 11 March 2022.

References

Further reading

External links

 Stations of the Sagami Line (JR East) 

 
Lines of East Japan Railway Company
Railway lines in Kanagawa Prefecture
1067 mm gauge railways in Japan
Railway lines opened in 1921
1921 establishments in Japan